Sunburn is the full-length debut album by the band Fuel released in 1998. It was produced by Steven Haigler. The songs "Shimmer", "Jesus or a Gun", and "Bittersweet" were released as singles. "Shimmer" peaked at #42 on the Billboard Hot 100.

Sunburn was certified Platinum (one million units sold) by the RIAA on May 24, 2000.

Track listing
All songs written by Carl Bell.

The "special expanded edition" re-issue of the album including two bonus tracks was released on September 23, 2003. "Walk the Sky" was initially recorded in 1998 with producer Brendan O'Brien for the Godzilla soundtrack.

Reception

Personnel
 Brett Scallions - lead vocals, rhythm guitar
 Carl Bell - lead guitar, backing vocals
 Jeff Abercrombie - bass
 Jonathan Mover - drums

Production
 Steven Haigler: Producer
 Brendan O'Brien: Producer on "Walk the Sky"
 Tom Lord-Alge: Mixing
 Ted Jensen: Mastering

Charts

Weekly charts

Year-end charts

Certifications

Notes

References

1998 debut albums
Fuel (band) albums
Epic Records albums
Albums recorded at Long View Farm